The 1852 United States presidential election in New York took place on November 2, 1852, as part of the 1852 United States presidential election. Voters chose 35 representatives, or electors to the Electoral College, who voted for President and Vice President.

New York voted for the Democratic candidate, Franklin Pierce, over the Whig Party candidate, Winfield Scott. Pierce won the state by a margin of 5.21%. Abolitionist Free Soil party candidate John Hale took 4.85% of the vote. William Goodell of the Liberty party, another smaller abolitionist party, also took a tiny portion of the vote. So did Daniel Webster, running as a Whig nominated against his will by a group of southern Whigs unsatisfied with Scott. Despite dying a few weeks before the election, he received 0.08% of the vote, mostly in New York City. This was one of the few northern states where he received votes. 

This was the last strong performance by a Democrat in upstate New York until 1964, when Lyndon Johnson swept every New York county. It was thus the last time that many New York Counties voted for a Democrat. It was the final election in which the Whig party and not the Republican party provided the main opposition to the Democrats. After the birth of the Republican Party, upstate New York remained a Republican bastion for over a century, even through the Democratic landslides of the 1930s.

Results

County Results

See also
 United States presidential elections in New York

References

New York
1852
1852 New York (state) elections